Alphonse François Margailland (1 March 1909 – 21 October 1989) was a French rower. He competed in the men's eight event at the 1928 Summer Olympics.

References

External links
 

1909 births
1989 deaths
French male rowers
Olympic rowers of France
Rowers at the 1928 Summer Olympics
Place of birth missing
Sportspeople from Savoie